We Are....The Laurie Berkner Band is the name of both a compilation album and a DVD (and extremely rare VHS) by American children's music group The Laurie Berkner Band, both released in February 2006. It was their first DVD release, following their four best-selling CDs.
We Are...The Laurie Berkner Band included the previously-unreleased song "Walk Along the River". The DVD is aimed at children ranging from 2–8 years.

Track listing
 "I'm Gonna Catch You" (3:26)
 "We Are the Dinosaurs" (2:19)
 "Victor Vito" (2:28)
 "Walk Along the River" (2:19)
 "Under a Shady Tree" (2:50)
 "Bumblebee (Buzz Buzz)" (2:53)
 "Oh Susanna" (2:21)
 "The Goldfish" (3:27)
 "Pig On Her Head" (1:45)
 "Moon Moon Moon" (1:41)
 "Telephone" (End Credits) (1:41)

BONUS
 "I Know a Chicken" (Behind the Scenes) (3:17)
 "I'm a Mess" (Backstage) (0:59)
 "Moon Moon Moon" (Learn the Moves Version) (1:41)

BONUS AUDIO DISC
 "Walk Along the River"
 "We Are the Dinosaurs"
 "Telephone"
 "I'm Gonna Catch You"
 "The Happiest Song I Know"

Total Running Time = 46:50

External links
- Laurie Berkner Band Homepage

2006 albums